A ribonucleoside is a type of nucleoside including ribose as a component.

One example of a ribonucleoside is cytidine.

References

Ribosides